Sarah Morgan Bryan Piatt (Sallie M. Bryan; August 11, 1836 – December 22, 1919) was an American poet.  Her career began in the mid-1850s and lasted into the early twentieth century.  She published hundreds of poems in nationally circulated newspapers, magazines, and anthologies as well as in eighteen volumes of poems, two of which she co-authored with her husband, the poet John James Piatt (also known as "J.J.").
Although Sarah Piatt is not well known today, during her lifetime her work was widely read and reviewed in the U.S. and Europe.

Early years and education
Sarah Morgan Bryan was born near Lexington, Kentucky, on August 11, 1836. She was the eldest of three children of Talbot Nelson Bryan and Mary Spiers Bryan, both descended from slaveholding families. Her mother was related to the Stocktons, Simpsons, and other early Kentucky settlers. Her paternal grandfather, Morgan Bryan, was one of the pioneer settlers of that state and the early settlement Bryan's Station, as well as a relation by marriage of Daniel Boone, whom the Bryans accompanied from North Carolina into Kentucky.

When she was three, the family moved near Versailles, Kentucky. When Piatt was eight, her mother died. The loss had a profound impact on her life and outlook, as evident in her poetry. After her mother's death, Piatt lived on various Kentucky plantations with relatives, accompanied by her mother's nurse, an enslaved African-American woman. For a time, she lived with her grandmother, and then later went to live with her father at the home of his new wife. Eventually, her father placed her and a younger sister in the care of their aunt, Mrs. Annie Boone, who lived in New Castle, Kentucky.

In New Castle, Piatt attended Henry Female College, graduating in 1854. She became an avid reader, and was especially fond of Percy Bysshe Shelley, Samuel Taylor Coleridge, and Lord Byron, Thomas Moore, Walter Scott, Felicia Hemans, and Robert Browning. While a student, she began publishing her poetry in the local newspaper. During the early part of her career, she published under her maiden name, Sarah (or Sallie) M. Bryan, or her initials, S.M.B.

Career
When George D. Prentice, writer, poet, and editor of the Louisville Journal, encountered her poetry, he immediately recognized her talent and skill. In 1855 he wrote to her: "I now say emphatically to you again . . . that, if you are entirely true to yourself, and if your life be spared, you will, in the maturity of your powers, be the first poet of your sex in the United States. I say this not as what I think, but what I know." Prentice became Piatt's mentor and advocate, publishing many of her poems in his newspaper. She also began sending her work to The New York Ledger, a popular and important periodical with a national circulation.

On June 18, 1861, she married aspiring poet John James Piatt (also known as "J.J."), who at the time was working as a secretary for Prentice. The couple relocated to Washington, D.C. where J.J. had accepted a clerk position in the U.S. Treasury. During this period they published a collection featuring a section of poems by each of them, The Nests at Washington (1864). The work was J.J.'s second book (following the 1861 Poems of Two Friends with William Dean Howells) and Sarah's first. Throughout their relationship, J.J. managed Sarah's career, including submitting her poems to periodicals and arranging for the publication of her work in book form.

In July 1867, they moved to Ohio, where J.J. worked for Cincinnati newspapers. They made their home on a part of the old estate of William Henry Harrison in North Bend, Ohio, a few miles south of Cincinnati, on the Ohio River. The family shuttled back and forth to Washington D.C. on a few occasions, such as when J.J. worked for the postal service. From 1870 to 1876, Sarah and the children joined J.J. in Washington D.C. in the winters where he was serving as librarian of the United States House of Representatives. During this time, Sarah's poems appeared in the Washington, D.C. weekly newspaper The Capital, founded by Donn Piatt, her cousin by marriage.

Her first independent collection of poetry, A Woman's Poems, appeared anonymously in 1871. This came to be her best known work, made famous by Bayard Taylor's book, The Echo Club. The volume was followed by several more, including A Voyage to the Fortunate Isles (Boston, 1874), That New World (Boston, 1876), Poems in Company with Children (Boston, 1877), and Dramatic Persons and Moods (Boston, 1878). During this period, she also contributed to many prominent American magazines, such as The Atlantic Monthly, Scribner's Monthly, The Century Magazine, Harper's Magazine, and St. Nicholas Magazine.

In 1882, the Piatts moved to Queenstown (now Cobh) Ireland, as J.J. had accepted the position of Consul of the U.S. to Cork, a job he held for eleven years. While abroad, Sarah wrote many poems inspired by her time in Ireland. She continued publishing poetry collections, including An Irish Garland (Edinburgh, 1884), Selected Poems (London, 1885), In Primrose Time: a New Irish Garland (London, 1886), The Witch in the Glass, and Other Poems (London, 1889), and An Irish Wild-Flower (London, 1891), all of which were issued simultaneously in the U.S. Sarah and J.J. also published another volume featuring both of their work, The Children Out-of-Doors: a Book of Verses (Edinburgh, 1884).

Personal life

Piatt was the mother of Marian (b 1862); Victor (1864); Donn (1867); Fred (1869); Guy (1871); Louis (1875); and Cecil (1878) as well as at least one infant child and possibly others who died in infancy. Victor died in a tragic fireworks accident in 1874, and Louis drowned in a boating accident in 1884 while the Piatts were living in Ireland.

After J.J.'s death in 1917, Piatt lived with her son Cecil in Caldwell, New Jersey. She died of pneumonia on December 22, 1919. Sarah and J.J. are buried at Spring Grove Cemetery, Cincinnati, Ohio.

Themes and reception

According to scholar Paula Bennett, “the bulk of Sarah Piatt’s poetry can be divided into five thematic categories: poems on the Civil War and its aftermath, North and South; poems of gender (romance and marriage); poems about motherhood and to/on children; poems inspired by the Piatt’s stay in Ireland (1882-1893) and travels on the continent; and poems on set cultural themes: religion, dead heroes, moral or political allegories, art and artists.”  Bennett has suggested that Piatt's writing on motherhood and children was so prolific that she produced “what is probably the largest single body of poetry [on the topic] in the English language.”  More recently, Piatt scholar Elizabeth Renker has identified her as a major poet of Reconstruction sociopolitics.

During Sarah Piatt's lifetime, her work was mostly praised by critics. According to Emerson Venable's The Poets of Ohio (1909): “Mrs. Piatt is a woman of original and exceptional genius—a poet whose name shines in American literature.”  Yet some found her poetry too subtle. In the 1889 Encyclopedia Britannica entry about the poet, J.M. Stoddart observed that “her poems are thoughtful and deep in sentiment, but sometimes obscure.”  Literary scholar Karen L. Kilcup has tracked how critics typically praised “her womanliness while critiquing her obscurity and difficulty,” often remaining “oblivious to her depth.” 

Despite the popularity Piatt enjoyed during her career, her work fell into obscurity after her death in 1919. The new aesthetics ushered in and prized by modernist poets devalued popular poets of prior generations, including many women poets. Scholars began to rediscover Piatt's work in the mid-1990s, and two selected editions of her poems appeared in 1999 and 2001. Over the past twenty years, a growing body of scholarship has brought her to wider public attention as a contender for entry in the literary canon.

Selected works
  A Woman's Poems. 1871
 A Voyage to the Fortunate Isles. 1874
 That New World, & Other Poems. 1877
 Poems in Company with Children.  1877
 Dramatic Persons and Moods: with Other New Poems. 1880
 A Book about Baby and Other Poems in Company with Children. 1882
 An Irish Garland.  1885
 In Primrose Time: a New Irish Garland. 1886
 Mrs. Piatt's Select Poems: a Voyage to the Fortunate Isles and Other Poems. 1886
 Child's-World Ballads: Three Little Emigrants, a Romance of Cork Harbour, 1884, etc.  1887
 The Witch in the Glass, etc. 1888
 An Irish Wild-Flower, etc. 1891
 An Enchanted Castle, and Other Poems: Pictures, Portraits and People in Ireland. 1893
  Poems. 1894
 Complete Poems. 1894
 That New World: The Selected Poems of Sarah Piatt (1861-1911). Ed. Larry R. Michaels. Toledo, OH: Bihl House Publishing, 1999.
 Palace-Burner: The Selected Poetry of Sarah Piatt. Ed. Paula Bernat Bennett. Urbana: University of Illinois Press, 2001.

Collaborations
With her husband:
 The Nests at Washington, and Other Poems. 1864
 The Children Out-of-Doors: a Book of Verses.  1885

Further reading

 "Piatt, Sarah Morgan (Bryan)" in American Authors 1600-1900. New York: H. W. Wilson Company, 1938.

References

Attribution

Bibliography

External links
 
 The Sarah Morgan Bryan Piatt Recovery Project at The Ohio State University: includes The Early Poems of Sarah Morgan Bryan (Piatt) in The New York Ledger, 1857-1860 and Oral Histories and Written Memoirs, which currently features recorded interviews with pioneering Piatt scholars
 The Capital (Digital portal to full issues of the rare Washington, D.C.-based weekly newspaper edited by Piatt's cousin by marriage, Donn Piatt, who often published her poems in it. Digitization and hosting provided by The Ohio State University Libraries, Rare Books and Manuscripts Library.)
 New Finding List for Sarah Piatt's Poetry compiled by Paula Bernat Bennett (This is a list of selected poems by Piatt with a bibliographical record of all known printings of each poem in book and periodical form; a bibliography of all Piatt's published books; and a partial list of anthologies that reprinted her work.)
 Paula Bennett Research Materials for Palace-Burner: The Selected Poetry of Sarah Piatt The Ohio State University Libraries, Rare Books and Manuscripts Library
 Larry R. Michaels Biographical Research Notes on Sarah Piatt The Ohio State University Libraries, Rare Books and Manuscripts Library
 Sarah Piatt books and periodicals donated by Larry R. Michaels to The Ohio State University Libraries, Rare Books and Manuscripts Library
 Department of English at the University of Toronto. "Selected Poetry of Sarah Morgan Bryan Piatt (1836–1919)". Representative Poetry Online (RPO), hosted by the University of Toronto Libraries. Accessed August 19, 2008.

1836 births
1919 deaths
19th-century American poets
19th-century American women writers
Writers from Lexington, Kentucky
Poets from Kentucky
American women poets
Kentucky women writers
Wikipedia articles incorporating text from A Woman of the Century